The Iceland national football team schedule results and fixtures for 2010 in detail.

National team

Record

Updated as of 17 November 2010

Goal Scorers

Updated as of 17 November 2010

Schedule

References

 Iceland: Fixtures and Results